Christian University may refer to:

Indonesia
 Artha Wacana Christian University, Kupang, East Nusa Tenggara
 Duta Wacana Christian University (Universitas Kristen Duta Wacana), Yogyakarta, Java
 Maranatha Christian University, Bandung, West Java
 Petra Christian University, Surabaya, East Java
 Satya Wacana Christian University, Salatiga, Central Java

Japan
 Ibaraki Christian University, Hitachi, Ibaraki
 International Christian University, Mitaka, Tokyo
 Tokyo Woman's Christian University, Tokyo

Kenya 

Pan Africa Christian University, Nairobi, Kenya
Scott Christian University, Machakos, Kenya

Philippines 

Filamer Christian University, Roxas City, Capiz, Philippines
Philippine Christian University, Ermita, Manila, Philippines

Taiwan
 Chang Jung Christian University, Gueiren District, Tainan
 Chung Yuan Christian University, Zhongli District, Taoyuan City

United States

 Heritage Christian University, Florence, Alabama
 Arizona Christian University, Phoenix, Arizona
 California State Christian University, Los Angeles, California
 Colorado Christian University, Lakewood, Colorado
 Lincoln Christian University, Lincoln, Illinois
 Indiana Christian University, Noblesville, Indiana
 Kentucky Christian University, Grayson, Kentucky
 Cincinnati Christian University, Cincinnati, Ohio
 Ohio Christian University, Circleville, Ohio
 Mid-America Christian University, Oklahoma City, Oklahoma
 Oklahoma Christian University, Oklahoma City, Oklahoma
 Southwestern Christian University, Oklahoma City, Oklahoma
 Northwest Christian University, Eugene, Oregon
 Mid-Atlantic Christian University, Elizabeth City, North Carolina
 University of Mary Hardin-Baylor, Belton, Texas
 Abilene Christian University, Abilene, Texas
 Texas Christian University, Fort Worth, Texas
 Lubbock Christian University, Lubbock, Texas

Other places

 Christian Service University College, Kumasi, Ghana
 Martin Luther Christian University, Shillong, Meghalaya, India
 Dimitrie Cantemir Christian University, Bucharest, Romania
 St. Petersburg Christian University, St. Petersburg, Russia
 Uganda Christian University, Mukono, Uganda
 International Christian University – Kyiv, Kiev, Ukraine
 Southern Christian University (disambiguation)

See also
 Christian college
 Council for Christian Colleges and Universities
 Christian Albrechts University
 Christian Brothers University (Memphis, Tennessee)
 University Christian School